Liljedahl is a surname. Notable people with the surname include:

Edvard Liljedahl, (1845-1924) Norwegian politician
Magnus Liljedahl (born 1954), American sailor
Marie Liljedahl (born 1950), Swedish actress
Lennart Liljedahl (born 1947), Swedish chess player
Peter Liljedahl (born 1967), Swedish sprint canoer